Xu Jingye (born 1951 in Jiyuan, Henan) was chairman of the Chongqing Committee of the Chinese People's Political Consultative Conference (CPPCC) from January 2013 to January 2017.

Bibliography 
From 1969 to 1976, Xu was a soldier in the People's Liberation Army. He joined the Communist Party of China (CPC) in 1970, and became secretary of the Chongqing CPC Municipal Discipline Committee in 2006. He was a member of the Central Commission for Discipline Inspection from 2012 to 2017. In January 2018, he was elected member of the Member of the 13th CPPCC.

References 

1951 births
Living people
 
Chinese People's Political Consultative Conference
Chinese Communist Party politicians from Henan
Politicians from Jiyuan
People's Liberation Army personnel